Hemmatabad (also Romanized as Hemmatābād) is a village in Mohammadabad Rural District, in the Central District of Zarand County, Kerman Province, Iran. At the 2006 census, its population was 420, in 108 families.

References 

Populated places in Zarand County